Grevillea muricata is a species of flowering plant in the family Proteaceae and is endemic to Kangaroo Island in South Australia. It is a low, spreading shrub with narrowly oblong to more or less linear to cylindrical leaves and small groups of bright orange-red flowers.

Description
The edges of the leaves are rolled, under enclosing most of the lower surface, and the upper surface of the leaves is covered with small sharp points.

Taxonomy
Grevillea muricata was first formally described in 1939 by John McConnell Black in the Transactions of the Royal Society of South Australia from specimens collected between Vivonne Bay and Kingscote on Kangaroo Island in 1924. The specific epithet (muricata) means "muricate".

Distribution and habitat
The species grows in open woodland and in dense scrub in the central-eastern part of Kangaroo Island in South Australia.

References

muricata
Proteales of Australia
Endemic flora of Australia
Flora of Kangaroo Island
Taxa named by John McConnell Black
Plants described in 1939